The governor of Bukidnon, is the chief executive of the provincial government of Bukidnon, Philippines.

Provincial Governors (1953-2025)

References

Governors of Bukidnon
Bukidnon